DMAX is a television channel operated in Turkey. It replaced NTV Spor in March 2018.

External links 
  

2018 establishments in Turkey
Turkey
Television stations in Turkey
Television channels and stations established in 2018